The Rovno Ghetto (also: Równe or Rivne Ghetto, Yiddish: ראָװנע) was a World War II Nazi ghetto established in December 1941 in the city of Rovno, western Ukraine, in the territory of German-administered Reichskommissariat Ukraine. On 6 November 1941, about 21,000 Jews were massacred by Einsatzgruppe C and their Ukrainian collaborators. The remaining Jews were imprisoned in the ghetto. In July 1942, all remaining 5,000 Jews were trucked to a stone quarry near Kostopol and murdered there.

The ghetto was liquidated on July 13, 1942. Only a handful of Jews managed to escape deportation.

Background 

The city of Równe was the largest agglomeration in the province of Volhynia (Wołyń) of the Second Polish Republic. About 25,000 Jews lived in Równe, Wołyń Voivodeship in 1937. The town was a center for Jewish education with many Jewish schools including a Hasidic religious school (yeshiva).

When German troops invaded the Soviet Union in June 1941, the city fell to the Wehrmacht on June 28, 1941. On August 20, 1941, Rovno was declared the capital of German Reichskommissariat Ukraine. The Jewish ghetto in the city of Rovno was set up by the German administration soon after the Reichskommissariat Ukraine was formed.

At the beginning of the German occupation, around 23,000 Polish Jews resided in Rovno along with refugees from western Poland, which made up half the population of the city.

When the Nazis captured the city from the Soviets, they carried out several executions of its Jewish population in order to inflict terror and fear for the sake of coercion.

Creation and liquidation 
The ghetto or "Jewish residential area" was created in December 1941. It was an open ghetto created in the Wola neighborhood, on the edge of Rovno. 5,200 Jews initially lived there. The destruction of the Jewish people of Rovno occurred in three phases.

 About 3,000-4,000 Jews were killed in July and August. On 9 and 12 July 1941, the Einsatzkommando 4A of Einsatzgruppe C, a death squad, shot 240 Jews; in the official German report, the victims were dubbed 'Bolshevik agents' and 'Jewish functionaries'. On August 6, Order Police battalions conducted a second campaign in Rovno, in the course of which about 300 Jews were shot.
 The most bloody shooting took place on November 6–7, 1941, where 15,000-18,000 adult Jews were killed. The operation was led by the Commander of the Order Police led by Otto von Oelhafen with the assistance of Ukrainian Auxiliary Police and members of the OUN in the Sosenki forest near Rovno ('Sosenki' which means 'Little Pine Trees' in Polish). Jews were shot by Police Battalion 320 in coordination with the Einsatzgruppe 5th Division. 6,000 children had their neck broken or were buried alive under others victims at a killing site close to the adult one.
 The ghetto was liquidated in July 1942. On the night of July 13, 1942 at 22:00, the liquidation of the ghetto was carried out when a "shared" division of the SS and Ukrainian police units surrounded the ghetto, positioned spotlights around it and turned them on. Brigade SS and Ukrainian police were divided into small groups, broke into houses and pushed the people out, herded them into a freight train which took them to Kostopol (or Prokhurov) where they were shot to death in small Aktionen. 5,000 Jews were killed in this manner.  Several Aktionen took place in the neighbourhood afterwards.

The ghetto was declared "Judenrein" end July by the Reichskommissar Eric Koch.

The remaining 5,000 Jews who possessed  skills which enabled them to hold professions that were deemed essential to the administration of the occupation were taken away from their families and placed in the ghetto. 

It is estimated that 22,000-23,000 Jews were killed in Rovno.

On February 2, 1944 Rivne was liberated from German troops by  Soviet troops of the 1st Ukrainian Front during the Rovno-Lutsk operation.

Life in the Ghetto 
The ghetto had a Judenrat which consisted of 12 people. The two men who were appointed to head the Judenrat were Moses and Jacob Bergman (Leon) Suharchuk. They both committed suicide at the end of 1941 because they did not want to follow the Nazis' demand to turn over a group of Jews. The Jews living in the ghetto had to pay levies to the German authorities . In one operation to seize the money, the Jews were required to pay the German authorities the exact sum of 12 million Rubles. Also, the German authorities confiscated any gold, jewelry, furniture and clothing which remained in the Jews' possession. At the time of the operation, the Jews were selling clothes in order to get some food. The most valuable items were sent to Germany, the rest of them were given to German soldiers and Ukrainian policemen or they were sold to them for symbolic prices. In the ghetto numerous restrictions were imposed on the Jews, including the obligation to wear a distinctive sign.

Resistance 
Underground organizations operated in the ghetto and accumulated weapons.

150 Jews were saved by an engineer working for the local Reichsbahn, Hermann Graebe, as the ghetto was being liquidated. The Jews who managed to escape deportations joined the partisans and later took part in the liberation of Rovno by the Red Army in the Battle of Rovno, in February 1944. The surviving Jews began to gather in the city after the arrival of the Red Army, and by the end of 1944, some 1,200 Jews were accounted for in Rovno; among them, future author David Lee Preston (The Sewer People of Lvov) and his family.

Post war 
A memorial was created in 1992 on the site of the Sosenski massacre. On June 6, 2012, the memorial was vandalized, allegedly as part of an antisemitic act.

See also
 
 Mizocz Ghetto ( distance)
 Trochenbrod (Zofiówka) ( distance)
 Łuck Ghetto ( distance)

Notes

References

External links
 

Ghettos in Nazi-occupied Europe
Holocaust locations in Ukraine
Jewish ghettos in Nazi-occupied Poland
Jewish Ukrainian history
World War II sites in Poland
World War II sites of Nazi Germany